A list of metropolitan areas located on the island of Ireland.

Geography of Ireland